Marián Šarmír (born 1 May 1976) is a Slovak football manager of Partizán Bardejov.

References

1976 births
Living people
Slovak football managers
Slovak expatriate football managers
FC Spartak Trnava managers
Partizán Bardejov managers
Slovak Super Liga managers